Cyclotriol (developmental code name ZK-136295; also known as 14α,17α-ethanoestriol) is a synthetic estrogen which was studied in the 1990s and was never marketed. It is a derivative of estriol with a bridge between the C14α and C17α positions. The drug has 40% of the relative binding affinity of estradiol for the human ERα. It showed an absolute bioavailability of 40% with high interindividual variability and an elimination half-life of 12.3 hours in pharmacokinetic studies in women.

See also
 List of estrogens § Estriol derivatives
 Cyclodiol

References

Abandoned drugs
Estranes
Phenols
Synthetic estrogens
Triols